Friday Download: The Movie (released theatrically as Up All Night) is a 2015 British comedy film directed by John Henderson and is based on Friday Download, a children's entertainment programme airing on CBBC. The film was announced in 2014 and was released on 22 May 2015. It stars Dionne Bromfield, Shannon Flynn, Bobby Lockwood, George Sear, Richard Wisker, Ethan Lawrence, Louisa Connolly-Burnham and Tyger Drew-Honey. The film was distributed by Great Point Media and produced by Jeremy Salsby, Jules Elvins and Dan Shepherd, with Toby Davies writing the screenplay.

Cast 
 Dionne Bromfield as Dionne
 Shannon Flynn as Shannon
 Bobby Lockwood as Bobby
 George Sear as George
 Richard Wisker as Richard
 Ethan Lawrence as Fraser
 Louisa Connolly-Burnham as Clara
 Tyger Drew-Honey as Caleb
 Luke Langsdale as Uncle Pete
 Angus Barnett as Gene Peck
 David Mitchell as Policeman
 The Vamps as themselves
 Bars and Melody as themselves
 Greg Davies as himself  (cameo)

Production 
The film was shot over four weeks in and around Swansea. Filming commenced on 6 September 2014 in Margam Country Park, Wales. The film was fully financed by Great Point Media and is produced by Jeremy Salsby of Saltbeef TV and Jules Elvins of Pilot Media.

Release 
Friday Download: The Movie was released in the UK and Ireland on 22 May 2015, exclusively in Vue cinemas. The film was released under the title Up All Night. International sales were handled by Genesis Media Sales.

Home media 
Friday Download: The Movie was released on DVD and on demand by Spirit Entertainment Limited on 19 October 2015.

References

External links 

 
 

2015 films
Films based on television series
Films directed by John Henderson (director)
2010s English-language films